Amerila abdominalis is a moth of the subfamily Arctiinae. It was described by Walter Rothschild in 1933. It is found in Indonesia and Malaysia.

References

Moths described in 1933
Amerilini
Moths of Asia